Johannes Haller (16 October 1865 – 24 December 1947) was a Baltic German medievalist and teacher at the universities of Tübingen, Marburg and Giessen.

Haller was born in Käina and studied history in Tartu and at the Frederick William University in Berlin. He was expert in the field of the history of Christianity. He died in Tübingen.

External links 

 BBLD - Baltisches biografisches Lexikon digital

1865 births
1947 deaths
People from Hiiumaa Parish
People from the Governorate of Estonia
Baltic-German people
German medievalists
University of Tartu alumni
Academic staff of the University of Tübingen
Academic staff of the University of Marburg
Academic staff of the University of Giessen